State Route 94 (SR 94) is a north–south state highway in the U.S. state of Ohio. It stretches  from U.S. Route 250 and SR 241 in the village of Mount Eaton to U.S. Route 42 in Cleveland.

History

1924: State Route 94 was formed. It originally ran from Riceland, a village south of Orrville, to what was then State Route 36 (now State Route 585) north of Orrville.
1926: Extended north to Cleveland and its current northern terminus along a formerly unnumbered road.
1935: Extended again, this time southward to U.S. Route 250.
1938: Extended past U.S. Route 250 to the town of Fredericksburg.
1963: The route is truncated from Fredericksburg to U.S. Route 30 at Riceland. The former route is now Wayne County Route 94A (Carr Road).
1969: State Route 57 is extended along the existing route of State Route 94 from Riceland to State Route 585 (formerly State Route 5). State Route 94 is rerouted from Wadsworth to its current southern terminus at Mount Eaton.

Major junctions

References

094
Wadsworth, Ohio